Rex Boyes is a former association football player who represented New Zealand at international level.

Boyes made his full All Whites debut in a 0-4 loss to Australia on 4 September 1948 and ended his international playing career with six A-international caps to his credit, his final cap an appearance in a 6-4 win over Fiji on 7 October 1951.

References 

Year of birth missing (living people)
Living people
New Zealand association footballers
New Zealand international footballers
Association football forwards